This is a list of by-elections to the Northern Ireland House of Commons, from its creation in 1921 until its abolition in 1972.

References
 Biographies of Members of the Northern Ireland House of Commons

By-elections
Northern Ireland politics-related lists
Northern Ireland
Northern Ireland Parliament by-elections